Rîbnița or Rybnitsa ( or  , Moldovan Cyrillic alphabet: Рыбница; , Rybnitsa; , Rybnytsia; , Ribnitse) is a town in Transnistria (de facto) in Moldova (de jure). According to the 2004 census, it has a population of 53,648. Rîbnița is situated in the northern half of Transnistria, on the left bank of the Dniester, and is separated from the river by a concrete dam. The town is the seat of the Rîbnița District.

History

Rîbnița was founded in 1628 as the Ruthenian village Rybnytsia, its name meaning "fishery" (from рꙑба, "fish"). As early as 1657, Rîbnița was mentioned in documents as an important town, at the time part of the Kingdom of Poland. Strong Western European influences can be seen in this formerly Polish town. In 1793, Rîbnița passed from Poland to Russia.
On March 17, 1944, during World War II, the Nazis executed almost 400 prisoners, Soviet citizens at Rîbnița.

Economy
Rîbnița is home to Transnistria's largest company, a steel plant which produces more than $500 million worth of exports a year and traditionally has accounted for between 40% to 50% of Transnistria's GDP. Other industries are also present in Rîbnița, including the oldest sugar plant in Transnistria (founded in 1898), an alcohol distillery, and a cement factory. The city has a large railway station and a river port, as well as a supermarket owned by Sheriff.

People and culture
Central Rîbnița has tall buildings and an active city life. There is a popular park near the town reservoir, and many historical and architectural monuments in the town and its surrounding areas. The main street in the town is Victory Street.

Demographics
In 1970, Rîbnița had a population of 32,400 people; in 1989 it had increased to 61,352. According to the 2004 Census in Transnistria, the city had 53,648 inhabitants, including 11,235 Moldovans, 24,898 Ukrainians, 11,738 Russians, 480 Poles, 328 Belarusians, 220 Bulgarians, 166 Jews, 106 Germans, 96 Gagauzians, 71 Armenians, 38 Roma, and 4245 others and non-declared.

Religion
Rîbnița has three places of worship located right next to each other; a Catholic church, an Orthodox church, and a synagogue.

Sport
FC Iskra-Stal Rîbnița is the city's professional football club, playing in the top Moldovan football league, the Divizia Națională.

Notable people 

 Rabbi Chaim Zanvl Abramowitz, (born 1902 Rybnitsa – 1995) known as the Ribnitzer Rebbe and considered a great Hasidic tzadik 
 Meir Argov (1905 in Rybnitsa – 1963 in Israel) a Zionist activist and Israeli politician
 Gherasim Rudi (1907 in Sărăței – 1982 in Chișinău) was a Moldavian SSR politician, the prime minister of Moldavian SSR 1946 – 1958
 Petru Pascari (born 1929 in Stroenți) was a Moldavian SSR politician, prime minister of Moldavian SSR  1970 – 1976 and in 1990
 Ivan Calin (1935 in Plopi – 2012 in Chișinău) was a Moldovan politician. Calin was President of the Presidium from 1980 to 1985 then prime minister of the Moldavian SSR until 1990.
 Eugen Doga (born 1937 in Mocra) is a Moldovan composer
 Yevgeny Shevchuk (born 1968 in Rybnitsa) a former President of the Pridnestrovian Moldovan Republic, better known as Transnistria
 Olena Lukash (born 1976 in Rybnitsa) a Ukrainian jurist and politician and former Minister of Justice of Ukraine, member of the Party of Regions
 Dima Kash (born 1989 in Rybnitsa) a Russian-born singer-songwriter and rapper based in Twin Cities, Minnesota
 Artiom Rozgoniuc (born 1995 in Rybnitsa) a Moldovan footballer who plays for FC Petrocub Hîncești
DoReDos is a trio composed of Marina Djundyet, Eugeniu Andrianov, and Sergiu Mîța, who represented Moldova in the Eurovision Song Contest in Lisbon, Portugal, in 2018.

International relations

Twin towns — Sister cities
Rîbnița is twinned with:
 Dmitrov, Russia
 Hola Prystan, Ukraine
 Lakeland, Florida, United States
 Vinnytsia, Ukraine

References
Notes

External links 
 Official site of the city
 Rybnica (Rîbnița) in the Geographical Dictionary of the Kingdom of Poland (1889)
 City portal
 Map of Rîbnița

 
Cities and towns in Transnistria
Cities and towns in Moldova
Populated places on the Dniester
Bratslav Voivodeship
Baltsky Uyezd